Walvoord is a surname. Notable people with the surname include:
 Henry Walvoord (1847–1909), American farmer and politician
 John Walvoord (1910–2002), American Christian theologian